Santillana may refer to:

People
Antonio Fernández Santillana (1876–1909), Spanish-French aviation pioneer
Everardo Zapata Santillana (born 1926), Peruvian teacher and author
Íñigo López de Mendoza, 1st Marquis of Santillana (1398–1458), Castilian politician and poet
Leonardo Santillana (born 1998), Mexican equestrian
Santillana (footballer) (born 1952), Carlos Alonso González, Spanish footballer

Places
Santillana del Mar, a town in Cantabria, Spain
Santillana de Campos, a hamlet of Osorno la Mayor, Palencia, Spain
Santillana District, Huanta district, Peru

Other uses
Grupo Santillana, a Spanish publisher owned by Penguin Random House

See also
Santillán, a surname